Eugenia umtamvunensis is a species of plant in the family Myrtaceae. It is endemic to South Africa.  It is threatened by habitat loss.

References

Flora of South Africa
umtamvunensis
Vulnerable plants
Taxonomy articles created by Polbot